Tsang Sun Chiu (曾順釗), better known by stagename Szema Wah Lung (司馬華龍), (2 August 1921 – 27 July 2012) was a Hong Kong film actor.  He was known for his roles as a veteran evergreen actor, the Green Leaf King (綠葉王). In many films he played police captains.

Selected filmography
 Story of the White-Haired Demon Girl (1959)
 The Story of the Great Heroes (1960)
 Story of the Sword and the Sabre (1963)
 Naughty! Naughty! (1974)
 Bruce Lee and I (1976)
 Last Hero in China (1993)
 Drunken Master II (1994) - Senior in Restaurant #2
 The Blade (1995)
 My Left Eye Sees Ghosts (2002)

References

External links
 
 Hong Kong Cinemagic entry

1921 births
2012 deaths
Hong Kong male film actors